Grus pagei is an extinct crane reported from the upper Pleistocene asphalt deposits of Rancho La Brea, Los Angeles, California. It is one of three cranes present at Rancho La Brea, the others being the living whooping crane (Grus americana) and sandhill crane (Antigone canadensis). It is the smallest of the three cranes, and it had a relatively longer, more slender skull than the living cranes. At least 11 individuals are represented by 42 fossil bones. Described by Kenneth E. Campbell Jr. in 1995, it was named after the philanthropist responsible for the museum at the tar pits, George C. Page.

References

Grus (genus)
Fossil taxa described in 1995
Pleistocene birds
Pleistocene birds of North America